Cavit Erdel (1884; Adrianople (Edirne) – 5 March 1933; Ankara) was a military officer of the Ottoman Army and a general of the Turkish Army.

See also
 List of high-ranking commanders of the Turkish War of Independence

Sources

External links

 

1884 births
1933 deaths
People from Edirne
People from Adrianople vilayet
Ottoman Military Academy alumni
Ottoman Military College alumni
Ottoman Army officers
Ottoman military personnel of the Italo-Turkish War
Ottoman military personnel of the Balkan Wars
Members of the Special Organization (Ottoman Empire)
Ottoman military personnel of World War I
Turkish military personnel of the Turkish–Armenian War
Recipients of the Medal of Independence with Red-Green Ribbon (Turkey)
Turkish Army generals
Deputies of Kars